Tobias Arlt (born 2 June 1987) is a German luger who has competed since 1991, acting as a backdriver. He won a silver medal in the men's doubles event at the 2008 FIL World Luge Championships, a silver and a bronze at the 2010 FIL European Luge Championships, a gold medal at the FIL World Luge Championships 2013, and two gold medals at his debut Olympics, the 2014 Winter Olympics in Sochi.

Biography
Tobias Arlt was born on 2 June 1987 in Berchtesgaden, West Germany. He began luging at the age of four, beginning to compete in 1991; his national debut was in 2006. Arlt is a backdriver in luging, and his partner for doubles is Tobias Wendl. As a team, they have several nicknames, including "The Bayern-Express" and "The Two Tobis".

At the 2008 FIL World Luge Championship in Oberhof, Germany, in the men's doubles, Arlt won a silver medal. At the 2010 FIL European Luge Championships in Sigulda, Latvia, Arlt won a silver in the men's doubles and a bronze in the mixed team disciplines; and at the 2013 FIL World Luge Championships, he won a gold medal. Arlt and Wendl have finished in first place in the overall World Cup standings three times in the last four years.

Arlt is also a police officer in the German Federal Police. His hobbies, besides luging, include tennis, windsurfing, snowboarding, and motorbiking.

Olympics
At Arlt's debut Olympics, the 2014 Winter Olympics in Sochi, Arlt won gold in the luge double with Tobias Wendl in a time of 1 minute and 38:933 seconds at the Sanki Sliding track, half a second ahead of the second-placed Austrians Andreas Linger and Wolfgang Linger. This was the biggest ever winning margin in Olympic luge doubles. In Arlt and Wendl's first run, they set a track record of 49.373 seconds. Arlt then won the team relay with Felix Loch, Natalie Geisenberger, and Tobias Wendl. They won in a time of 2 minutes and 45.649 seconds, which was one second ahead of the second-placed Russian Federation.

Personal life
Arlt has a girlfriend, who, in December 2013, gave birth to a daughter.

Luge results
All results are sourced from the International Luge Federation (FIL) and German Bobsleigh, Luge and Skeleton Federation (BSD).

World Cup

References

External links

1987 births
Living people
People from Berchtesgaden
Sportspeople from Upper Bavaria
German male lugers
Olympic lugers of Germany
Lugers at the 2014 Winter Olympics
Lugers at the 2018 Winter Olympics
Lugers at the 2022 Winter Olympics
Olympic gold medalists for Germany
Olympic medalists in luge
Medalists at the 2014 Winter Olympics
Medalists at the 2018 Winter Olympics
Medalists at the 2022 Winter Olympics
21st-century German people